Johannes Akkerhaugen (born 11 August 1939) is a Norwegian archer. He was born in Sauherad. He competed in archery at the 1972 Summer Olympics in Munich.

References

External links
 

1939 births
Living people
People from Sauherad
Norwegian male archers
Olympic archers of Norway
Archers at the 1972 Summer Olympics
Sportspeople from Vestfold og Telemark